William Wrightson may refer to:
 William Wrightson (MP, born 1676) (1676–1760), British landowner and politician, MP for Newcastle-upon-Tyne, and for Northumberland 
 William Wrightson (MP for Aylesbury) (1752–1827), British landowner and politician

See also
  William Battie-Wrightson (1789–1879), British landowner and politician, MP for East Retford, for Kingston upon Hull, and for Northallerton